WBFX (101.3 FM, "Big FM") is a radio station broadcasting an oldies format, serving the Grand Rapids, Michigan market and owned and operated by iHeartMedia. The studios and offices are located at 77 Monroe Center in Downtown Grand Rapids while its transmitter is located near 5 Mile Rd and Lincoln Lake Ave northeast of Grand Rapids.

History
The station first began broadcasting in 1962 as WMAX-FM, then became WYON as a sister station to WION in Ionia, Michigan in 1965.  In 1976, the station was purchased by the owners of WCUZ 1230 and became WMLW ("Mellow 101"), a soft rock/adult contemporary station.  WMLW switched to album oriented rock as WFFX "The Fox" in 1978, and then to country music in 1980 as WCUZ-FM ('CUZ-FM 101.3...more of the music you like... on CUZ-FM."  For most of the 1980s, country WCUZ was a market leader in Grand Rapids, but the station saw its market share erode after the 1992 debut of "B93," WBCT-FM, on 93.7.

By 1998, WCUZ was co-owned with its rival station, WBCT, under the umbrella of Clear Channel Communications, and had moved to a classic country format, identifying as "Country Gold WCUZ." Clear Channel (which would become iHeartMedia in 2014) dropped the "Country Gold" format on September 24, 2000, and debuted classic rock "101.3 The Fox" that afternoon following coverage of the MBNA.com 400 NASCAR Winston Cup event. They changed call letters to the current WBFX on September 27, 2000.

The lineup at the debut was Bob and Tom (with Big Richard), Ranger Bob, Aris Hampers and Otto Mation and Alison Harte. Others jocks over the decade would include Matt Hendricks (AKA Big Richard), Jack Lawson, Mark Fuerie, Andy O'Riley, Shafee and Joe Daugherty. The station also featured Nights With Alice Cooper for several years in the evenings.

Since its inception, WBFX has changed its music style multiple times, although all remained loosely in the classic rock genre.  In late June 2009, the station adjusted its format towards mainstream rock, with a mix of harder classic rock songs as well as recent rock music from the 1990s and 2000s.  This adjustment was in response to the local active rock station WKLQ changing formats to sports talk.  By 2010, however, Townsquare Media's WGRD-FM adjusted its format to active rock from alternative rock, and saw a decent rise in the ratings, while WBFX remained roughly the same.  After this, WBFX rebranded as "The Next Generation of Classic Rock", and adjusted their playlist back towards having a classic rock feel, but with a stronger emphasis on 1980s and 1990s era taking on WLAV-FM.

On February 20, 2013, WBFX began running liners advising listeners that "The Fox dies Friday". At Noon the next day, after playing "The Breakup Song" by The Greg Kihn Band and "The Final Countdown" by Europe, the station rebranded as "101.3 The Brew", with an acknowledgement of Grand Rapids being voted as 2012's "Beer City USA" according to a poll conducted on Examiner.com and the noteworthy rise of the popularity and economic impact of microbreweries in the region.  The station launched with "Enter Sandman" by Metallica.  Musically, the station was tweaked with more rock titles from the 1980s and 1990s added into the playlist.  The presentation and formatics are similar to other stations called "The Brew" that Clear Channel has deployed in places such as Portland, OR, Columbus, OH and Wichita, KS.  With sister station WMAX-FM having taken the ESPN Radio affiliation in recent years, WBFX continues to air NASCAR Sprint Cup Series races, as they have for over a decade.

On July 6, 2015, WBFX tweaked their format towards an active rock-leaning mainstream rock presentation.  While titles going back to the 1960s were occasionally played, the emphasis was strongly on rock music of the 1990s and 2000s.

The ratings slid heavily a few months after this prior tweak in the format.  On February 16, 2016, WBFX shifted the format back to classic rock, with emphasis on 1970s and 1980s rock music. They also changed the lineup of announcers to prefer locally-based ones instead.

On January 23, 2017, the station added the Rover's Morning Glory hot talk radio show during morning drive time.

On March 21, 2019, the station tweaked the playlist once again, eliminating much of the pre-1980s rock music and adding many well-known 1990s rock songs.

On October 23, 2020, at 5 a.m., after playing "Cumbersome" by Seven Mary Three, WBFX began stunting with a loop of the fight songs of Michigan State University, Florida State University, and "Anchors Aweigh", the fight song for the United States Naval Academy. At Noon the following day, the stunt shifted to the broadcast of that day's Michigan State football season opener (which they would lose to Rutgers, 38-27). Following the broadcast, the station debuted a 60's and 70's-focused oldies format as "101.3 Big FM". The first song on "Big" was "A Little Less Conversation" by Elvis Presley. Positioned as "Grand Rapids' Fun Hits You Know", the new format puts WBFX between Townsquare Media's combo of WTRV and WFGR. The only oldies station in the market had been Grand Valley State University's non-commercial WGVU. The change comes as WBFX's classic rock format had a 1.9 share in the September 2020 Nielsen Audio ratings.

HD Radio
WBFX is licensed for HD Radio operations. They previously featured iHeartRadio's "Full Metal Jackie" programming on its HD2 channel. As of late 2022, this broadcast was eliminated and only the primary HD1 channel remains.

References

External links
Michiguide.com - WBFX History

BFX
Oldies radio stations in the United States
Radio stations established in 1962
IHeartMedia radio stations